The Boeing Small Launch Vehicle, or SLV, is an air-launched three-stage-to-orbit launch vehicle concept aimed to launch small payloads of  into low Earth orbit.

History
In July 2012, DARPA awarded Boeing a US$4.5 million contract to further refine the system concept as a part of the DARPA ALASA program.

Description
Both of the first two stages would be reusable to reduce launch cost, and both stages would carry only fuel, and obtain their oxygen for combustion from the Earth's atmosphere.  
The carrier aircraft is projected to be a Scaled Composites White Knight Two.

Specifications 
First-stage:   length,  wingspan, supersonic aircraft 
Second-stage:   in length,  wingspan, hypersonic aircraft; "Overall airframe construction would be of graphite-epoxy, with an integral conformal liquid methane tank to supply the vehicle’s circular combustion scramjet. Thermal protection would be a ceramic matrix composite material."

See also

References

Proposed space launch vehicles